William Lester Wendt (March 20, 1915 – March 12, 1966) was an American basketball coach and professional player. He was the head coach of DePaul University from 1940 to 1942, guiding them to a 23–20 record.  Wendt had played at DePaul during the late 1930s and had a brief professional playing career with the National Basketball League's Hammond Ciesar All-Americans.

References

External links
NBL stats

1915 births
1966 deaths
American men's basketball coaches
American men's basketball players
Basketball coaches from Illinois
Basketball players from Chicago
DePaul Blue Demons men's basketball coaches
DePaul Blue Demons men's basketball players
Forwards (basketball)
Hammond Ciesar All-Americans players
Sportspeople from Chicago